The Munger House is a historic house in rural eastern Johnson County, Arkansas. It is a two-story masonry structure, built out of uncoursed fieldstone and topped by a Dutch Colonial gambrel roof with shed dormers. The roof overhangs a recessed porch supported by square columns. The house interior retains original features, including Art Nouveau light fixtures. It was built in 1934 for Hubert and Vera Munger, and is the area's finest example of Dutch Colonial architecture.

The house was listed on the National Register of Historic Places in 1996.

See also
National Register of Historic Places listings in Johnson County, Arkansas

References

Houses on the National Register of Historic Places in Arkansas
National Register of Historic Places in Johnson County, Arkansas
Houses in Johnson County, Arkansas